Oleksandr Mykolayovych Skrypnyk (born 7 November 1958 in Odessa) is a retired Ukrainian football player and coach. He has played in different Soviet clubs.

External links
  Profile on football.odessa.ua

1958 births
Living people
Ukrainian footballers
Soviet footballers
FC Chornomorets Odesa players
FC Elektrometalurh-NZF Nikopol players
FC Rotor Volgograd players
FC Krystal Kherson players
Ukrainian football managers
FC Chornomorets Odesa managers
FC Chornomorets-2 Odesa managers
Expatriate football managers in Moldova
FC Zimbru Chișinău managers
Ukrainian expatriate football managers
Ukrainian expatriate sportspeople in Moldova
Association football defenders
Moldovan Super Liga managers
Footballers from Odesa